As-salamu alaykum, also written salamun alaykum and typically rendered in English as salam alaykum, is a greeting in Arabic that means 'Peace be upon you'. The  (meaning 'peace') has become a religious salutation for Muslims worldwide when greeting each other, though its use as a greeting pre-dates Islam, and is also common among Arabic speakers of other religions (such as Arab Christians and Mizrahi Jews).

In colloquial speech, often only the first part of the phrase (so: , 'peace') is used to greet a person.

Among Christians, during Mass or other liturgical services, the priest or pastor and the congregation often use the salutation, "peace be with you", sometimes replying, "and also with you".

Cognate Semitic language parallels include the Aramaic/Classical Syriac , and the Hebrew .

Pronunciation
The phrase is normally pronounced according to local dialects of speakers and is very often shortened.

For example:
 In Egypt: , 
 By native English-speaking Muslims: ,

Grammatical variants
The expression commonly uses the second person plural masculine, even when used to address one person. It may be modified by choosing the appropriate enclitic pronoun to address a person in the masculine and feminine singular form, the dual form, or the feminine plural form. The conjugations are as follows (note: according to the standard pronunciation rules of Classical Arabic, the last short vowel in each word is not pronounced in pausa):

A third-person variant, ʿalayhi as-salām, "peace be upon him", is often used by Muslims for prophets other than Muhammad and other holy personalities, such as angels.

In Islam 

According to Islamic tradition, the origin of the greeting "Peace be upon you" dates back to the first human, Adam:

Abu Huraira reported: The Prophet, peace and blessings be upon him, said, “Allah said: Go and greet with peace these groups of assembled angels and listen to how they greet you, for this will be the greeting among your progeny. Adam said: Peace be upon you. The angels said: Peace be upon you and the mercy of Allah. Thus, they added the mercy of Allah” 

The final Prophet said, “None of you will enter paradise until you believe and you will not believe until you love one another. Shall I not tell you about something which, if you do it, you will love one another? Spread salaam amongst yourselves.” 

It is also stated that one should give the Salam greeting upon entering a house. This is based upon a verse of the Quran: "However, when you enter houses, greet one another with a greeting ˹of peace˺ from Allah, blessed and good. This is how Allah makes His revelations clear to you, so perhaps you will understand." (An-Nur 24:61).

The phrase appears a total of 7 times in the Quran, each time as salamun ʿalaykum.

 Surah Al-An'am (6), Ayah 54:

 Surah Al-A'raf (7), Ayah 46:

 Surah Ar-Ra'd (13), Ayah 24:

 Surah An-Nahl (16), Ayah 32:

Surah Maryam (19), Ayah 47:

Surah Al-Qasas (28), Ayah 55:

Surah Az-Zumar (39), Ayah 73:

Other variants, such as salamun ʿalā, or the term salam alone is also mentioned in several other Ayahs of the Qur'an.

Usage by non-Arabic speakers
 Cognate Semitic language parallels include the Aramaic/Classical Syriac šlāmā  ʿalḵōn (ܫܠܵܡܵܐ ܥܲܠܟ݂ܘܿܢ), and the Hebrew Shalom aleichem ( shālôm ʻalêḵem).
 In Iran, Afghanistan, Azerbaijan and Tajikistan, Salâm is used alone more frequently, with occasional use of Salam-o aleykom and the more common beh salâmat, meaning "[go] with peace". Goodbye is supplanted by a Khudâ hâfez, meaning "with the protection of God".
 In Albania and Kosovo, a diminutive form in the Albanian language, Selamun Alejkem or Selamun Alejqum is rarely used, the 'q' being a voiceless palatal stop typical of Balkan Turkish and Thracian Turkish phonology. Similarly, Bosniaks and Macedonian Muslims use the phrase "".
 In Amharic, the native Amharic term Selam is used in place of Tadias, which is the equivalent of "What's up".
 In Turkey, Kazakhstan and Kyrgyzstan, many religious people use "Äs-sälamwaleykum" or "" and shake hands and it is the same for saying "Hello"; more secular and non-religious people say "Selam" and in Kazakhstan say "Sälem" or "Sälemetsız be" as an equivalent to "Hello" or "Hi". However, many Turks pronounce it differently as "Selamün aleyküm".
 In Pakistan, the greeting is also associated with shaking right hands and is also often accompanied with a hug when meeting infrequently (only between the same gender). In some places, people put a hand on their heart as they shake your hand and greet. Also, the full greeting is preferred versus the shorter greeting, "salam". Goodbye is supplanted by a "Khuda Hafiz"  or the variation "Allah Hafiz", both of which mean "May God protect you".
 In India, the greeting mostly among Muslims is a simple handshake or hug, As-salamu alaykum or the shorter greeting "Salam" is used in informal situations. Goodbye is supplanted by a "Khuda Hafiz" or the alternative form "Allah Hafiz", both of which mean "May God protect you".
 In Bangladesh, Assalamu alaikum is the most common Muslim greeting. Some Muslims greet their elders with these words whilst raising their right hand to the forehead. Assalamu alaikum is even used as to say goodbye, while many others say "Khoda Hafez" or "Allah Hafez" "May God protect you".
 In Uzbekistan and Turkmenistan, Assalomu aleykum is used as an informal greeting.
 In Indonesia, the greeting is sometimes mixed with other greeting phrases of other religions.
 Shortening the greeting to acronyms, such as A.S., As'kum (in Malaysia), or AsA is becoming common amongst Internet users in chat rooms and by people using SMS. This trend is similar to writing (S) or SAWS in place of ṣallā llāhu ʿalayhi wa-sallam.
 In Chechnya and other parts of the Caucasus, Salamun Alaykum is used to say hello, in Ossetia, a corrupted version of Salam is used.
 In Senegal which has a majority of Muslims with Tasawwuf-orientation, it is a common greeting. Spelled and pronounced in Wolof: "a-sala māleykum", with the reply being "må-lekum salām."
 In Xinjiang, China, "Essalam eleykum" is used as a greeting by Uyghurs, and the reply is "We-eleykum essalam".
 In Portugal, the expression Salamaleque gained a totally distinct and curious meaning: due to the habit of Iberian Arabs to bow and wave their hand when greeting a person, the expression "Salamaleque" is applied to exaggerated movements or acts in order to appear to be formal, entertaining or fancy. "Os rapazes chegaram cheios de salamaleques".
 In Italy, Salamelecco has a similar meaning, referring to excessive courtesy and politeness.
 In France, salamalec has similar meaning, referring to excessive flattery.
In Malta, "Is-sliem għalikom" is often used in Catholic Church masses as a way of greeting, often by the priest, as a way of saying "peace be upon you". As the Maltese language derives from Arabic, it inherited and still uses Arabic terms for religion amongst other things.
In the Maldives, "" (assalaam 'alaikum) is used as a common formal greeting, used similar to "hello".
In Nigeria, the phrase "assalamu alaikum" is used as a formal greeting by Muslims.
In Kurdish, the phrase "" is used as a formal greeting among, often shortened to just "".
 In Russia, Muslims use variations of the phrase, such as "" (Russian) and "" (Tatar).

See also

References

External links
 A brief illustrated guide to understanding Islam
 How to pronounce As salamu alaykum in Arabic
 How To Pronounce Assalamualaikum Warahmatullahi Wabarakatuh in Arabic
 How to pronounce Walaikum Assalam in Arabic

Arabic words and phrases
Arabic words and phrases in Sharia
Greeting words and phrases
Islamic honorifics
Islamic terminology
Religion and peace